Parliamentary elections were held in Transnistria on 29 November 2015, alongside municipal elections.

Electoral system
The 43 seats of the Supreme Council are elected in single-member constituencies using first-past-the-post voting.

Campaign
A total of 138 candidates contested the elections.

Results
Obnovlenie won 35 out of 43 seats in the Supreme Council, maintaining their status as a majority government. Obnovlenie leader Mikhail Burla was re-elected in constituency #34, as was PCP leader Oleg Khorzhan in constituency #40 (Tiraspol).

Overall turnout was 48.3%, with the Camenca District reporting the highest turnout of 54.0%. The lowest turnout was in the city of Bender, with a turnout of only 42.7%.

Aftermath
On 23 December 2015, Vadim Krasnoselski, who was elected in constituency #7, was elected Speaker.

References

Elections in Transnistria
2015 elections in Europe
2015 in Transnistria
Election and referendum articles with incomplete results